Chimaobi Sam Atu is a Nigerian politician and a real estate developer. In 2023, he was elected a member of the National Assembly representing Enugu North / Enugu South Federal Constituency under the Labour Party.

Background 
Chimaobi Sam Atu was born in Umumba Ndiaga Ugwuaji in Enugu South Local Government Area of Enugu State in 1982. In 2006, he completed his bachelor's degree in Enugu State University of Science and Technology

Personal life 
Chimaobi Atu is married to Ezinne Maureen Atu

References 

Living people
1982 births
People from Enugu State
Enugu State politicians